Walsall Football Club was formed in 1888 when Walsall Town and Walsall Swifts amalgamated. They joined the Football League in 1892, as founder members of the new Second Division.

The table below details the club's achievements in all national competitions and records their average attendance and top goalscorer for each completed league season.

Key
Key to league record:
P = Games played
W = Won
D = Drawn
L = Lost
F = Goals for
A = Goals against
Pts = Points
Pos = Final position

Key to rounds:
1Q = 1st qualifying round
2Q = 2nd qualifying round
3Q = 3rd qualifying round
4Q = 4th qualifying round
5Q = 5th qualifying round
6Q = 6th qualifying round
IR = Intermediate round
PR = Preliminary round

R1 = Round 1
R2 = Round 2
R3 = Round 3
R4 = Round 4
R5 = Round 5
QF = Quarter-finals
SF = Semi-finals

AR1 = Area round 1
AR2 = Area round 2
AQF = Area quarter-finals
ASF = Area semi-finals
AF = Area final

Seasons

Overall
 Seasons spent in First Division / Premier League (1st tier): 0
 Seasons spent in Second Division / Championship (2nd tier): 15 (1892–95, 1896–01, 1961–63, 1988–89, 1999–00, 2001–04)
 Seasons spent in Third Division / League One (3rd tier): 75 (1921–58, 1960–61, 1963–79, 1980–88, 1989–90, 1995–99, 2000–01, 2004–06, 2007–19)
 Seasons spent in Fourth Division / League Two (4th tier): 12 (1958–60, 1979–80, 1990–95, 2006–07, 2019–)

Correct up to end of 2021–22 season.

Notes

References

External links

Seasons
 
Walsall